Irileka is a monotypic genus of Western Australian huntsman spiders containing the single species, Irileka iridescens. It was first described by D. B. Hirst in 1998, and is found in Western Australia.

See also
 List of Sparassidae species

References

Monotypic Araneomorphae genera
Sparassidae
Spiders of Australia